Johanna Margarethe Stern-Lippmann (6 January 1874 in Berlin – 22 May 1944 in Auschwitz) was a German Jewish art collector and victim of the Holocaust.

Life 
From 1918 Margarethe Stern (née Lippmann) lived with her husband the businessman and art collector Siegbert Samuel Stern, founder of Grauman & Stern, in Neubabelsberg, Potsdam. The couple had four children between 1899 and 1909. The couple lived on the Griebnitzsee in the prestigious Villa Stern, in Kaiserstraße 3 (today Karl-Marx-Straße).

Nazi persecution and murder 
When the Nazis came to power in 1933, the couple was persecuted because of their Jewish origins. Siegbert Stern died in Berlin on 7 August 1935. In the spring of 1937, Margarethe Stern fled, first to Badenweiler, then in the summer of 1938 via Switzerland to Amsterdam, where her brother-in-law Albert Stern was already based.

Hitler's race laws targeted Jews, throwing them out of work, banning them from owning businesses and imposing special confiscatory fees and taxes that obliged them to sell assets to survive. Margarethe Stern was forced to sell the Villa Stern in November 1940, although its unclear whether she received any of the proceeds.

In May 1940, the National Socialists occupied the Netherlands. Margarethe Stern tried to obtain an exit visa for herself and some family members by handing over a painting by the artist Henri Fantin-Latour to the Nazi looting organisation, called the Dienststelle Mühlmann. The exit visas were still not issued.

Stern-Lippmann went into hiding, but was arrested in April 1943 and deported to Auschwitz where she was murdered on 22 May 1944. Her daughter Louise Henriette and her husband died with her. Margarethe Stern-Lippmann's other children survived the war.

Restitution claims for artworks 
The painting by Henri Fantin-Latour was returned to the heirs of Margarethe Stern in 1949.

After the fall of the Berlin Wall in 1989, the Villa Stern was restored with the aid of the Jewish Claims Conference.

In 2006 negotiations were held about the return of one of the 144 paintings by the Stern family, which had ended up in a German museum in Karlsruhe after being looted in 1942.  The Circumcision by Jan Baegert, also called the Master of Cappenberg, was returned following a decision by the Dutch Restitution Committee.

In 2014 a search report was published by German Lost Art Foundation for a painting by Max Liebermann, Reiter am Strande, owned by the Stern family.

In 2018, the Restitution Committee dealt with Wassily Kandinsky's painting Blick auf Murnau, which hangs in a museum in Eindhoven. The family complained to the Dutch culture minister about the 'careless' mistakes and a lack of empathy. In 2022, responding to international criticism, the Dutch Restitutons Committee reversed its earlier decided and recommended that the Kandinsky be restituted to Stern's heirs.

In December 2020, Roselyne Bachelot-Narquin, the French Minister of Culture, announced the restitution of seven artworks from the 18th and 19th century to the heirs of "Margarite" Stern.

 D'après Jean-Antoine Watteau, Concert dans un parc, huile sur toile, 34x39 cm (MNR 890) ;
 Cornelis Beelt (XVIIe), Intérieur d'écurie, huile sur bois, 37x29 cm (MNR 923) ;
 Mathys Schoevaerdts (fin XVIIe), Place avec église, obélisque et passants, huile sur bois, 35x51 cm (MNR 925) ;
 Anonyme XVIIIe siècle, Scène dans un parc, gouache, 28x32 cm (REC 146) ;
 Manière de Jean-Honoré Fragonard, Scène galante, aquarelle, 28x21 cm (REC 147) ;
 Alexandre-Gabriel Decamps (XIXe), Deux singes au piano, aquarelle, 22x28 cm (REC 149) ;
 Ernest Meissonier (XIXe), Joueurs d'échecs, dessin, 15,50x18 cm (REC 150).

Searches for more than one hundred artworks continue today.

See also 
 The Holocaust
 Nazi plunder
 The Holocaust in the Netherlands
 List of claims for restitution for Nazi-looted art

References

External links 
 Jewish Monument commemorates Johanna Margarethe Stern
 Artikel im Telegraph vom 18. März 2020 zu Raubkunst
 Artikel in Dutch News vom 19. März 2020 zu dem verschwundenen Kandisky Gemälde
 Yad Vashem - Margarethe Stern in der Liste ermordeter Juden
German Lost Art Foundation Database: Stern-Lippmann, Margaretha und Siegbert Ster n

 
1874 births
1944 deaths

German people who died in Auschwitz concentration camp

Jewish emigrants from Nazi Germany to the Netherlands
German Jews who died in the Holocaust
Jewish art collectors
Women art collectors
German art collectors
Jews and Judaism in Germany